The 423rd Maryland General Assembly convened in a regular session on January 10, 2007, and adjourned sine die on April 10, 2007.

Senate

Party composition

Leadership

Members

Notes
 This Senator was originally appointed to office by the Governor to fill an open seat.

 The President of the Senate does not serve on any of the four standing legislative committees. He does, however, serve on both the Executive Nominations and the Rules Committees.

House of Delegates

Party composition

Leadership

Members

See also
 Current members of the Maryland State Senate

Notes

References
General
 
 
 
 

Specific

External links
 Maryland General Assembly

Maryland legislative sessions
2007 in Maryland